Monzón is a small city and municipality in the autonomous community of Aragon, Spain. Its population was 17,176 as of 2014. It is in the northeast (specifically the Cinca Medio district of the province of Huesca) and adjoins the rivers Cinca and Sosa.

Historical overview

Prehistory and Old Age
The first signs of constant human occupation in the area of Monzón come from Neolithic. There have been found some archaeological remains of that era on the deposits Sosiles Altos and Peña Lucas. Most vestiges of civilization come from the Bronze Age, where it is assumed that people settled in the area between the rivers Cinca, Sosa and clamor. The ilergetes were the people occupying these areas, who were defeated in the 3rd century BC, producing the Romanization of the area from the 2nd century BC. In the hills of the Ermita de la Alegría (the shrine of Joy) and the cells were found remains of Roman dwellings, being this area a key point in the connections from the cities of Caesaraugusta or Osca with Italy .

Middle Ages

Muslim Era
At the time of Muslim domination Monzón was disputed by the Banu Sabrit from Huesca and Banu Qasi from Zaragoza. It belonged to the Banu Hud in the 11th century and was taken by El Cid in 1083. The Christians were interested to conquer Monzón in order to cut communications between the taifa kingdoms of Zaragoza and Lleida. The infant Pedro I reconquered Monzón in 1089 during the reign of his father Sancho Ramírez. Sancho Ramírez created the Kingdom of Monzón for the infant, future Pedro I, before he became king of Aragon. This situation lasted until 1126, when it reverted to Muslim hands for four years. Between 1130 and 1136 it was held by Christians, who lost the town in the period 1136-1141 to finally win her back. 1143 happened to belong to the Templars.

Christian Era

The Cathedral de Santa María del Romeral (Saint Mary of the Rosemary Field), grew from the 9th century Torre del Homenaje which hosted kings and nobles. Here in 1109 Urraca of Castile married her second husband Alfonso I ("The Battler") despite the Church's objections concerning consanguinity.

During medieval times Monzón was a stronghold of the Knights Templar because of its strategic location between the Segre and Cinca valleys. It was also as an important center for joint legislative sessions for the various segments of Aragon, especially between the 13th and 17th centuries because of its location between Zaragoza and Barcelona. The Teutonic Knights were also known to have had a commandery here since 1222. 

During the 12th century Monzón was ruled by the infant Ramiro de Navarra, Tizón and García Ramírez before his proclamation as King of Navarre among others. When in 1143 the Knights Templar assigns its rights to the Crown of Aragon receives in exchange the Castle of Monzón among others, where the main task of the Crown of Aragon happened. The most historically important event in this period is the enforced residence of James I ("The Conqueror") who spent part of his youth in Monzón. After his father Peter II ("The Catholic") died in the Battle of Muret (1213); the Knights Templar in Monzon served as the young king's guardians and tutors. When the Pope Clement V extinguishes the Knights Templar, some parcels like Monzón resisted, and it was not until 1309 when it was conquered. In 1317 passes to sanjuanistas hands, although the hosts will lose its power gradually. Monzón also hosted numerous times the Cortes of the Crown of Aragon, between the 13th to 17th centuries. The Cathedral of Santa María del Romeral of Romanesque and the castle with its origins in the 9th century (Torre del Homenaje) welcomed the king and his nobles.

Modern and Contemporary Age
In this town the Cardinal Richelieu and Gaspar de Guzmán, Count-Duke of Olivares signed a treaty here, ending the conflict over Valtelline in 1626.

During the Catalan Revolt Monzón was taken by the French-Catalan troops run by Philippe de La Mothe-Houdancourt in 1642 and, the following year, by the Castilian troops of Felipe da Silva.

The Castle of Monzón is considered a strategic enclave, was also occupied by the French during the War of Independence and recovered in 1814 as national cause by the troops of General Copons in a bold ploy due to the Spanish military of Flemish origins John Van Halen, later Lieutenant General, who had conquered Lérida and Mequinenza by the same way.

Industry and communications
The industrial tradition of Monzón began early in the 20th century with the construction of a sugar factory which later was moved to Jerez de la Frontera. After the Spanish Civil War, some new industries were incorporated such Hidro Nitro Spanish (HNE), Aiscondel, Etino-Química Polidux, Monsanto-Aiscondel, among others. It also appeared a factory wire, nails and corrugated. This industrialization was possible thanks to the geographical situation of the town, an hour and a half far from the border and Zaragoza as well as by its good communications such as roads linking with Zaragoza and Lleida, the highway (A-22) communicating with Pamplona and the railway line that communicates with Barcelona, northern Spain and Zaragoza and Lleida to connect with the AVE, the high speed train.

Culture

The music is represented by Grupo Folclórico de Nuestra Señora de la Alegría, Municipal Band "La Lira" the Coral Montisonense and the Conservatory of Music "Miguel Fleta" that have come new groups like Ensemble XXI. Within the panorama of rock, there are large groups such as those of black metal like Ouija, Temple Abattoir and Spellcraft. In other aspects of the culture of Monzón highlight the numerous fairs like the Aragonese book or FLA, retracts and the art fair artery. There are also noteworthy various contests of painting and narrative as well as several cultural concentrations of various kinds and the feast of Saint Barbara martyr in which it is performed the traditional Bautizo del Alcalde (Baptism of the Mayor) and the festivities in honor of Saint Matthew during the week of September 21 and pilgrimage that achieves Easter Monday to the Ermita de la Alegría (Hermitage of the Virgin of the Joy).

Sport

Clubs
The local association football team is Atlético Monzón.

Tournaments
The women's tennis tournament Torneo Conchita Martínez is hosted every year and is part of the ITF Women's Circuit.

Players and athletes
Monzón has been home to sportsmen and women like Conchita Martínez, the first Spanish woman to win Wimbledon, and Eliseo Martín, bronze medal winner in the 3000 m steeplechase in the Paris World Championships (2003) — the only non-African athlete to get a medal in those championships since 1993.

Monzón has been home to Olympic athletes, including Javier Moracho (110 m hurdles) — Spanish record holder for almost 20 years — the decathlete Álvaro Burrell, and the renowned pole vaulter Javier Gazol.

Hydrology 

Monzón is crossed by the rivers Sosa and Cinca. The latter is the most important because it has higher flow thanks to the amount of snow in its head. In the first one, despite its very little flow, it is remarkable the engineering work in Siphon of the Sosa, a viaduct over the river which flows the Aragon and Catalonia Canal, which was inaugurated in early 20th century by King Alfonso XIII to extend irrigation to the eastern part of the province

Monzón is one of the largest agricultural and industrial populations in the region thanks to the Aragon and Catalonia Canal.

Places of interest
 El Castillo Templario (The Castle of the Knights Templar)
 La Catedral de Santa María del Romeral (The Cathedral of Saint Mary of the Rosemary Field, 12th and 13th centuries)
 El Convento de San Francisco (Saint Francis Convent, now dedicated to musical education and headquarters of the orchestral group Ensemble XXI)
 La Ermita de la Virgen de la Alegría (The Happiness Virgin Shrine, from the 17th century)
 Major House (16th and 17th centuries)
 La Puerta de Luzán (Luzán Gate)

Notable people from Monzón
 Eliseo Martín (born 1973): long-distance runner specialized in 3000 metres steeplechase.
 Conchita Martínez (born 1972): former tennis player and Wimbledon Champion in 1994.
 José Luis Mumbiela Sierra (born 1969): Roman Catholic clergyman and Bishop of the Holy Trinity Diocese in Almaty.
 Javier Moracho (born 1957): retired hurdler  winner at the European Indoor Championships in 1986 and silver medal winner at the inaugural World Indoor Games in 1985.
 Barón de Eroles (1860–1941): lawyer and philanthropist who brought to Monzón one of the first X-ray machines in Spain.
 Reverendo Vicente Pilzano y Ezquerra: before the 18th century, he wrote important chronicles about the city.
 Ignacio de Luzán (1702–54): his poetry is studied in universities all around the world.
 José Mor de Fuentes: naval engineer and writer, author of books including La Serafina, La fonda de París, El calavera, A la muerte de Lord Byron, and Los nuevos desengaños.
 Joaquín Costa y Martínez (1846–1911): one of the greatest men of the Regeneracionismo. He developed theories about education, water management and agricultural politics that were followed throughout the 20th century. Oligarquía y Caciquismo is one of his best books.
 Mariano de Pano y Ruata (1847–1948): He was president of the Ateneo and Academia de Bellas Artes de San Luis. He was the official chronicler of the monasterio de Sijena and of the Real Academia de la Historia. His best books are Las coplas del Peregrino, Puey de Monzón, Viaje a la Meca en el siglo XVI and La condesa de Bureta doña Consolidación de Azlor.
 Joaquín de Pano y Ruata (1849–1919): engineer, ornithologist, filologue, translator of several languages, including Chinese and Japanese. He designed bridges in Monzón and one of them served as the model for bridges in Zaragoza.
 Ramiro Sáncez of Monzón (1070-1116): Lord of Monzón and Logroño and father of García Ramírez of Navarre.
 John of Montson (c. 1340-1412): Dominican theologian and controversialist.
 Elijah ben Joseph Chabillo: philosopher and translator.

Twin towns

 Barcelona, Spain
 Muret, France

Notes and references

External links

Official site

Towns in Spain
Municipalities in the Province of Huesca
Castles and fortifications of the Knights Templar